Statistics of League of Ireland in the 1974–75 season.

Overview
It was contested by 14 teams, and Bohemians won the championship.

Final classification

Results

Top scorers

Ireland, 1974-75
1974–75 in Republic of Ireland association football
League of Ireland seasons